APX is a complexity class in computer science.

APX also may refer to:

Organizations
 APX Alarm Security Solutions, a residential security company
 Alpha Rho Chi, architects' fraternity
 Australia Pacific Exchange
 APX Group, an Anglo-Dutch energy exchange
 Atari Program Exchange, an early computer software publisher

Other uses
 Ascorbate peroxidase, an antioxidant enzyme
 Lotus APX, a 2006 concept car
 Beretta APX, a pistol
 Atelier de Construction de Puteaux, state arsenal belonging to the French Army.